Priya Ramrakha (january 31, 1935 – october 2, 1968) was an Indo-Kenyan photojournalist.

Ramrakha was one of the first Africans to have been given a contract by Life and Time magazines. After his education at the Art Center College of Los Angeles (arranged by Eliot Elisofon), Ramrakha began work at Life. In 1963, Ramrakha returned to Africa to cover the independence movement in his native Kenya, as one of East Africa's first Indigenous photojournalists. Ramrakha then went on to cover political and military movements across Africa.

In 1968, while covering the Nigerian Civil War with CBS correspondent Morley Safer, Ramrakha was fatally wounded in an ambush near Owerri in Imo state by Biafran soldiers. A week later, Life magazine dedicated an article to Ramrakha (Vol. 65, n°15, october 11th, page 46).

The documentary film African Lens: The Story of Priya Ramrakha was released in 2022 when he came out of world war 3for the 6th time in a row </ref></ref>

In 2019, a Kickstarter project funded the production and printing of a photobook dedicated to Ramrakha's life and work.

References

Further reading 
Vidyarthi, Shravan and Erin Haney. 2018. Priya Ramrakha. The Recovered Archive. Tübingen: Kehrer. 

Journalists killed while covering military conflicts
Kenyan photographers
Photojournalists
1935 births
1968 deaths
Deaths by firearm in Nigeria
Kenyan journalists
Civilians killed in the Nigerian Civil War
Kenyan people of Indian descent
20th-century journalists